This is a list of colleges in Zimbabwe.

Bulawayo Polytechnic
Chinhoyi Technical Teachers College
Gweru Polytechnic
Harare Polytechnic
Kwekwe Polytechnic
Masvingo Polytechnic
Mutare Polytechnic
Speciss College
Zimbabwe College of Music
Zimbabwe Institute of Legal Studies
Mutare college
Trust Academy
Herentials College
Lighthouse College
Phoenix College
CITMA College
ILSA College

See also
Education in Zimbabwe
Schools in Zimbabwe
 Levels of education: higher education, foundation degree and further education

References

External links
 Ministry of Higher and Tertiary Education

 
Universities
Zimbabwe
Zimbabwe